The sport of football in the country of Oman is run by the Oman Football Association. The association administers the national football team as well as the Omani League. Football is the most popular sport in the country.

References